Vivencias is a video album by Puerto Rican singer Yolandita Monge. It was released in 1989 and includes performances of all the tracks of the studio album Vivencias. Three of the songs from this special music video ("Este Amor Que Hay Que Callar", "Débil", and "Quítame A Ese Hombre Del Corazón") were re-released in 2007 in DVD format along with the Demasiado Fuerte album.

Track listing

Format
It was released on VHS in an aspect ratio of 1.33:1.

Credits and personnel

Yolandita Monge – singer, performer

1989 video albums
Live video albums
CBS Records